Mang is an Austroasiatic language of Vietnam, China, and Laos. It is spoken mainly in Lai Châu Province, Vietnam and across the border in Jinping County, China. It was first documented only in 1974.

In China, the Mang people are also called Chaman (岔满), Abi (阿比), Mengga (孟嘎), Bageran (巴格然), and Mo (莫).

Distribution
In Lai Châu Province, Vietnam, Mang is spoken by 2,200 people in the districts of Sìn Hồ, Mường Tè, Phong Thổ, and in other nearby areas, including in Nậm Ban Township, Sìn Hồ District, Lai Châu Province. In China, Mang speakers numbered 606 people in 1999. The Mang of China claim to have migrated from Vietnam in recent times. Gao's (2003) Mang data is from Xinzhai (新寨), Nanke Village (南科村), and Jinshuihe Township (金水河镇).

The Jinping County Gazetteer from the Republic of China period lists 12 Mang villages: Gongdaniu (公打牛), Luowuzhai (落邬寨), Pinghe (坪河, in Xiazhai 下寨, Zhongzhai 中寨, Shangzhai 上寨), Hetouzhai (河头寨), Guanmuzhai (管木寨), Naxizhai (纳西寨), Bianjiezhai (边界寨), Longshuzhai (龙树寨), Caoguoping (草果坪), and Nanke (南科). 

The speakers of languages are counted as part of one of either these two nationalities status: Undistinguished or Yi

Vocabulary comparison

Comparison of some basic vocabulary words in Mang with other branches of Austroasiatic:

References

External links 
 RWAAI (Repository and Workspace for Austroasiatic Intangible Heritage)
 Mang in RWAAI Digital Archive

Mangic languages
Languages of China
Languages of Vietnam